The Abraham Lowenstein House is a historic house in Memphis, Tennessee. It was built in 1901 for Abraham Lowenstein, a Jewish Swiss immigrant who co-founded a department store in Memphis with his brothers. It belonged to the Beethoven Club from 1922 to 1946.

The house was designed in the Queen Anne architectural style. It has been listed on the National Register of Historic Places since January 5, 1984.

References

Houses on the National Register of Historic Places in Tennessee
National Register of Historic Places in Shelby County, Tennessee
Queen Anne architecture in Tennessee
Houses completed in 1901